H2O (1929) is a short silent film by photographer Ralph Steiner. It is a cinepoem showing water in its many forms.

In 2005, H2O was  selected for preservation in the United States National Film Registry by the Library of Congress as being "culturally, historically, or aesthetically significant".

The film can be seen on the Library of Congress web site.

References

External links
  
 
H2O at UbuWeb
H2O essay by Daniel Eagan in America's Film Legacy: The Authoritative Guide to the Landmark Movies in the National Film Registry, A&C Black, 2010 , pages 166-167 

1929 films
American black-and-white films
American silent short films
United States National Film Registry films
1920s American films